"Little Black Backpack" is a song by American rock band Stroke 9 from their third studio album Nasty Little Thoughts (1999). It was released to radio as the lead single from the album on August 22, 1999, by Universal. The song was collectively written by Stroke 9 and produced by Jerry Harrison. The song was inspired by a women's fashion trend in the late-Nineties. Commercially, "Little Black Backpack" achieved moderate success in the United States and reached the top 20 in New Zealand.

Writing and inspiration
"Little Black Backpack" was collectively written by Stroke 9. According to frontman Luke Esterkyn, the song was inspired by a late-Nineties fashion trend among women. He stated: "[The band] would go out and notice all these little black backpack purse things. Everyone had them. All these seemingly intelligent and cool girls bought into the trend." The song's message of jealousy was inspired by Esterkyn's ex-girlfriend, as he witnessed her wearing a black backpack while out with another man.

Chart performance and critical reception
"Little Black Backpack" achieved moderate success in the United States. The song peaked at number four on the Bubbling Under Hot 100 chart, in which it spent fourteen weeks on the chart.

Heather Phares of AllMusic referred to the song as college rock, in which she praised the radio-friendly nature of it.

Live performances
Stroke 9 performed the song at the 2000 California Music Awards.

Track listings and formats
 CD single
 "Little Black Backpack"  – 3:43
 "Down"  – 4:23
 "One Time"  – 3:20
 "Tear Me in Two"  – 5:12
 "Little Black Backpack" (live) – 3:43

Credits and personnel
Credits and personnel are adapted from the Nasty Little Thoughts album liner notes.
 Luke Esterkyn – vocals, guitar
 Eric Stock – drums, percussion
 John McDermott – guitar, background vocals
 Greg Gueldner – bass
 Jerry Harrison – producer
 Karl Derfler – recording
 Leff Lefferts – recording assistant
 Tom Lord-Alge – mixing
 Ted Jensen – mastering

Charts

References

1999 songs
1999 singles
Universal Records singles